Highway 799 is a provincial highway in the Canadian province of Saskatchewan. It runs from Highway 4 south of the city of Meadow Lake to Highway 698. Highway 799 is about 23 km (14 mi.) long.

Highway 799 runs through Cabana and south of Meadow Lake, traversing predominantly rural regions and linking the small communities of Goodfare, Broderick, and Wilkie. Additionally, it intersects the Lesser Slave River close to Goodfare.

The highway was constructed in the 1940s, and originally ran from the Alberta border in the west to Highway 9 in the east. In the 1960s, the western section was renumbered as part of Highway 5, leaving the current route of Highway 799 in place.

Highway 799 is an important route for local travelers, providing access to the nearby towns and communities. It is also used by commercial vehicles for access to industrial sites in the region.

See also 
Roads in Saskatchewan
Transportation in Saskatchewan

References 

799